John Bentley (1 March 1787 – 26 March 1859) was an English professional cricketer.  He was the brother of Henry Bentley.

Bentley was mainly associated with Middlesex and he made 13 known appearances in first-class matches from 1807 to 1817.

References

1787 births
1859 deaths
English cricketers
English cricketers of 1787 to 1825
Middlesex cricketers
Surrey cricketers
Marylebone Cricket Club cricketers
Hampshire cricketers
The Bs cricketers
Non-international England cricketers
E. H. Budd's XI cricketers